Kottiyoor Ulsavam or Kottiyoor Vysakha Mahotsavam is a 27-day annual pilgrimage observed by Hindus commemorating the Mythology of Daksha Yaga. The pilgrimage is similar to the Kumbh Mela of Prayag, where ablutions are performed. The temple and grounds are also known as Dakshina Kasi.

In Kottiyoor (Kerala), there are two shrines on the banks of the Vavali (Bavali) river. On the west bank sits the Thruchherumana Vadakkeshwaram Temple (called Ikkare Kottiyoor Temple by natives), which is a nalukettu temple complex. On the east bank, there is a temporary shrine called "Akkare Kottiyoor", where the festival ceremonies take place. This is opened only during the Vysakha Mahotsavam. During the Vysakha pilgrimage, puja is performed in a temporary temple (Ikkare Kottiyoor) in the same prehistoric Vedic location. Only temporary thatch huts, which are removed after the festival, are built. Every year, thousands of pilgrims come to the Yajna bhoomi. Yajna shala has a Swayambhu Shivalinga, where ablutions are performed. The Akkare Kottiyoor temple, where the yajna takes place, has no Sreekovil/Garbhagriha (sanctum sanctorum); instead, it is located on a raised platform made of river stones named Manithara (മണിത്തറ). The temple is located at the center of a pond that is the origin of a spring. From the pond, water flows towards the Vavali river to the west. The entire shrine looks like Shivalinga itself if viewed from the sky. This pond is called Thiruvanchira(തിരുവഞ്ചിറ). Devotees circumambulate the shrine within the pond, mostly in the rain. There is another raised circular platform beside the main shrine, called Ammarakal Thara(അമ്മാരക്കല്ല് തറ). Finally, there is a giant Jayanti vilakku (a type of Lakshmi lamp) and an idol covered by a palmyra leaf umbrella (ഓലക്കുട) there. It is believed that Sati immolates herself on Ammarakal Thara.

The Ikkare Kottiyoor temple and Akkare Kottiyoor temple are dedicated to Mahadeva. The Vavali River flows between the shrines. The Ikkare Kottiyoor temple is believed to have been created by Parashurama, whereas the Akkara Kottiyoor temple is a Swayam bhu, which means naturally formed. The system of rites and rituals of the temple were developed by Sankaracharya.

Period of pilgrimage
The festival occurs from the Swati Nakshatra of the Saka calendar month of Vaisakha to Chitra Nakshatra of Jyaistha month. This is equivalent to the Malayalam calendar months of Medam-Edavam to Edavam-Mithunam or the Gregorian months of May–June to June–July. The pilgrimage occurs during the monsoon season when there is abundant rainfall in the region. The flow of the Vavali river  water is suitable for ablutions and the sacred pond Tiruvanchira is filled with water. The climate during the pilgrimage is moderate to slightly cold.

Even though the pilgrimage is called Kottiyoor Ulsavam or Kottiyoor Festival, the programs related to the pilgrimage are only religious rituals there are no entertainment programs like festivals in other temples. Only Vedic hymns are recited and priestly rites and rituals  performed.

Legend

Daksha Yagna was an important turning point in the creation and development of sects in Hinduism like Shaktism and Shaivism. It is the story behind the 'Stala Purana' (Origin story of Temples) of Shakti Peethas.

Daksha organised a huge yaga and intentionally avoided Shiva and Sati. Even though discouraged by Shiva, who told her not to go to a function where she and her husband was uninvited; the personal bondage with her parents made Sati ignore social etiquette and her husband's wishes. Sati without Shiva went to the ceremony. She was snubbed by Daksha and insulted by him in front of the guests. Sati unable to bear further insult ran into the Sacrificial fire and immolated herself. Shiva upon knowing the terrible incident in his wrath invoked Virabhadra and Bhadrakali by plucking a lock of hair and thrashing it on the ground. Virabhadra and Bhoota ganas marched south and destroyed all the premises. Daksha was decapitated and the yagnja shaala was devastated in the rampage. The Bhutaganas' celebrated victory by plucking the beard of 'Presiding Master' of the yagnja, Sage Bhrigu as a war souvenir. Daksha was later forgiven and given life by fixing a ram (Male Goat)'s head and the yagna was allowed to complete, with the presence of all the divinity.

The story continues by the act of Vishnu in pacifying Shiva, who was in deep grief in seeing the half burned corpse of his beloved wife. Vishnu embraced Shiva to pacify him. Shiva unable to part with Sati took her corpse and wandered. The body parts of the corpse of Sati Devi fell in the places Shiva travelled. The places where the body parts Sati Devi's corpse fell came to be known as Shakti Peethas.

Vaishakha Festival rituals
The Kottiyoor Vysakha Mahotsavam() festival rites are performed by akkare Kottiyoor temple on the east side of Vavali river.

Kottiyoor Ulsavam is conducted in the Tiruvanchira pond in rainy season where only hay thatched huts are allowed. The sacred pond is a spring and a tributary of the Vavali river and is an appealing environment - a reminder of ancient vedic times. Kottiyoor itself is a serene hilly area. It is believed that Bhutaganas brings the materials needed for the rituals from the Tirunelli MahaVishnu Temple (10 km south of Kottiyoor Temple) through the Brahmagiri valley. Kottiyoor Temple, as its name implies, is the meeting of the Trimurti - Brahma, Vishnu and Shiva. The Shivalinga of the Kottiyoor Temple is Swayambhu i.e. formed naturally. Kottiyoor Temple pilgrimage is a rarity where each community is given right to perform specific rituals and duties for their pilgrimage.

The ceremonies for the Kottiyoou Festival, performed in sequential order, are

Purakkuvam, Neerezhunnallathu, Vavalikettu, Neyyattam                     , Bringing Agni and Ooda (Reed), "Vaal" Ezhunnallathu, "Chothi Vilakku" , "Naallam Thurakkal" , "Bhandaram Ezhunnallathu" , Thiruvona Aaraadhana , Ilaneervaipu , Ilaneerattam , Revathi Aaraadhana , Rohini Aaraadhana , Thrikur Ariyalavu , Makam , Kalam Varavu , Atham naal , Vallattom , Thengaeru , Chithra naal , Thrikkaleshattam , Thandilmeil Oonu , Vaal madakkam , Valiya Vattalam Payasam , Purakkuvam (Prakuzham, Purakuzham)

Rohini aradhana is an important ceremony. Kurumathoor Nayikan Brahman, the title of the head of a Vaishnavite family in the area, who has the birthright for the ceremony, performs the rite. He is considered a representation of Vishnu. The Namboothiri performs the rites and embraces the Swayambhu Shivalinga, i.e. Alingana Pushpanjali. This commemorates the incident which took place during the Daksha yaga. Shiva was in heartbreaking sorrow, when he saw the burned dead body of his beloved wife Sati. Rohini aradhana, is a reminder of how Vishnu embraced Shiva to pacify and comfort his dear mate.

Entry of Parashurama
Ages after the dreadful incident and havoc, carrying Sati Devi's tears and curse, the land started being governed by Kali (the personification of Kali Yuga, the reigning power of calamity). Kerala was submerged under water. Parashurama, who donated all his conquered land to Brahmins, needed a place to live. At the request of Varuna, he threw his axe from Gokarna to Kanyakumari and Kerala reemerged from the sea. Parashurama was attacked by Kali in Kottiyoor. He overpowered Kali and, as he raised his axe to kill him, the Trimurti materialised there and stopped Parashurama. He released Kali on the condition that he would never ever come into the premises of the Swyam Bhuu Linga of his Guru, Shiva, in Kottiyoor. He started the twenty-seven-day festival to remember the incidents that happened in the place.

Exclusiveness in rites
 Usha pooja is only for twenty-four days to match with the standard yaga period. However the rest of the pooja is conducted for all twenty-seven days.
 The quantity of Nivedyam is fixed as in ancient time. It not increased proportional to an increase in the number of pilgrims.
 No pooja is performed at Ammarakkal (Sati Devi's suicide site) only Pushpanjali and Nivedyam is offered.
 Punyaham is never performed, as the location is blessed with the congruence of the Shaiva, Shakta, Vaishnava divinities. Kottiyoor is so pure that all impurities are washed away. The location is the origin of a spring which form part of the Vavali River. The festival takes place during the rainy season.
 Ganapathi Homam is performed every day in morning.
 The whole premises is a temporary shelter and it is a replica of the ancient Vedic worship and culture, thousands of years ago. Unlike most pilgrimage sites there is no permanent temple structure. The pradakshinam (circumambualtion) is through a pond.

Access
 
The national highway passes through Kannur town.  Mangalore and Mumbai can be accessed on the northern side and Cochin and Thiruvananthapuram can be accessed on the southern side.  The road to the east of Iritty connects to Mysore and Bangalore.   The nearest railway station is Kannur on Mangalore-Palakkad line and the nearest airport is Kannur International Airport.

Image gallery

See also
 Virabhadra-Daksha
 Shaivism-Shaktism
 Shiva-Sati-Shakti Peethas
 Kottiyoor, Thalassery, Kerala
 Kottiyoor Vadakkeshwaram Temple-Tirunelli Temple

References

Bibliography of notable offline sources

Further reading

External links
Kottiyoor Temple

Hindu festivals
Religious festivals in India
Villages near Iritty